Sir Joseph Napier, 1st Baronet  (26 December 1804 – 9 December 1882) was an Irish Conservative Party Member of Parliament (MP) in the United Kingdom Parliament. He was also a barrister and judge, who served briefly as  Lord Chancellor of Ireland.

Career
He was the son of William Napier and Rosetta MacNaghten of Ballyreagh House, County Antrim, and was born in Belfast, Ireland, where his father was a prosperous brewer. The family had emigrated to Ulster from Scotland: they were descended from John Napier, inventor of the logarithm. He attended the Belfast Academical Institution and Trinity College Dublin, before being called to the Irish Bar in 1831. He had contemplated remaining at Trinity and seeking a fellowship, but his marriage in 1831 disqualified him, as Trinity required its fellows to be celibate. He built up a very large practice, and acquired an impressive reputation for learning, especially in the area of pleading. He became a Queen's Counsel (QC) in 1844.

He was MP for Dublin University from 1848 to 1858, after failing to be elected in 1847. He became Attorney General for Ireland from March to December 1852. He was also made a member of the Privy Council of Ireland in 1852. He received a Doctorate in Civil Law in 1853.

Napier was a staunch Tory in politics, and exceptionally diligent in attending to his political duties. He left the House of Commons when he was appointed Lord Chancellor of Ireland in 1858, an office he held until 1859. His appointment caused some surprise since he had made his reputation in the courts of common law, although he also did some chancery work. Some embarrassment was caused by the revelation that a previous holder of the office, Francis Blackburne, had been offered it a second time, and after an initial refusal had been willing to accept; Blackburne took his rejection very badly. Napier was created a Baronet in 1867 and appointed to the Privy Council of the United Kingdom in 1868, which entitled him to sit on the Judicial Committee of the Privy Council. Despite his obvious wish to return to office, he never became Chancellor again: even in the Tory party, his strong Evangelical views had made him enemies, while the Bar complained that his deafness made it impossible for him to conduct business efficiently. He accepted the position of Lord Justice of Appeal, but the reaction from the Bar was so unfavourable (his deafness rather than his religious beliefs seems to have been the issue here) that he withdrew his name. His publications include educational, mathematical and legal works.

In 1880, following the death of his eldest son William, a blow from which he never recovered, he retired to St Leonards-on-Sea in Sussex and died there on 9 December 1882. He was buried in Mount Jerome Cemetery, Dublin with a tablet to his memory placed in St Patrick's Cathedral, Dublin.

Reputation 

He was remembered as a learned jurist and a diligent Parliamentarian, but above all as a devout Protestant with a deep devotion to the Church of Ireland, whose disestablishment he fiercely opposed. When young he was an extreme Evangelical, and strongly opposed to Catholic Emancipation, but it is said that his views mellowed as he grew older. His earlier religious views led to a clash with Daniel O'Connell, who nicknamed him "Holy Joe". He was sometimes accused of hypocrisy, and certainly knew how to dissemble: candidates for office who were assured of his support sometimes found to their outrage that he had been blocking them all along.

Family
He married Charity (Cherry) Grace, daughter of John Grace of Dublin (from an old Kilkenny family), on 20 August 1831. Described as "an impulsive love match", the marriage was a very happy one. They had 2 sons: William John Napier, who predeceased his parents, to their intense grief, and Sir Joseph Napier, 2nd Baronet, and 3 daughters: Grace, Rosetta and Cherry. Lady Napier died on 4 March 1901.

One of his sisters, Rosetta Napier, married James Whiteside, Attorney General for Ireland and later Lord Chief Justice of Ireland. The warm friendship between the two men ended in a bitter quarrel which was never made up. Another sister, Mary Napier, married Echlin Molyneux who later became a Professor of English Law at Queen's University Belfast; she died young in 1831, leaving a son, James Henry.

John Robinson, founder and proprietor of the Dublin Daily Express, was a cousin: this assured Napier of favourable press coverage in a wide-circulation Unionist newspaper.

References

Bibliography

 Who's Who of British Members of Parliament: Vol. I 1832-1885, edited by Michael Stenton (The Harvester Press 1976)
 Andrew Shields, The Irish Conservative Party, 1852-1868: Land, Politics and Religion (Dublin, 2007)
 Authorized Report of the Proceedings of the Church Congress held at York, 1866. with speech from Napier
 Charles Mosley, Burke's Peerage and Baronetage, 107th edition, Wilmington, Delaware, U.S.A. 2003
 Copy of confirmation of arms to the descendants of Joseph Napier of St. Andrews, Co. Down and to his grandson, the Rt. Hon. Joseph Napier, M.P., Lord Chancellor of Ireland, son of William Napier of St. Andrews, 16 March 1867. Dublin: National Library of Ireland, Genealogical Office: Ms. 109, pp. 143–4
 Our portrait gallery - No. LXIX: The Rt. Hon. Joseph Napier, M. P. (With etching). The Dublin University magazine: a literary and political journal, Vol. XLI, pp. 300–314, March, 1853. National Library of Ireland.

 Ewald, Alexander Charles. The Life of Sir Joseph Napier, Bart., ex Lord Chancellor of Ireland: from his private correspondence. Longmans, Green. London, 492pp. 1887

External links
 

1804 births
1882 deaths
Lord chancellors of Ireland
Baronets in the Baronetage of the United Kingdom
Lawyers from Belfast
Members of the Privy Council of Ireland
Members of the Privy Council of the United Kingdom
Alumni of Trinity College Dublin
Irish Conservative Party MPs
UK MPs 1847–1852
UK MPs 1852–1857
UK MPs 1857–1859
Attorneys-General for Ireland
Burials at St Patrick's Cathedral, Dublin
Members of the Parliament of the United Kingdom for Dublin University
Members of the Judicial Committee of the Privy Council
Politicians from Belfast